Aristo is a 2008 play by American born playwright Martin Sherman, based on material in the book Nemesis by Peter Evans about the life of Aristotle Onassis after he met Jackie Kennedy.  It premiered at the Minerva Theatre, Chichester (11 September – 11 October 2008), was directed by Nancy Meckler and starred Robert Lindsay as Onassis.

Reviews
The play was poorly received by critics and did not transfer to the West End even though it had sold out in Chichester. However, critics agreed that Robert Lindsay's performance eclipsed the play.

Cast
Robert Lindsay - Onassis
Elizabeth McGovern - Jacqueline
June Watson - Eleni
Robin Soans - Costa
Denise Black - Dimitra
Julius D'Silva - Theo
John Hodgkinson - Yanni
Diana Quick - Maria
Joe Marsh - Alexander
Ben Grove - Musician
Graeme Taylor - Musician
Andrew Elias - Waiter
Nick Howard-Brown - Waiter

References

2008 plays
Plays based on books
Plays based on actual events
Plays based on real people
Plays set in the 1960s
Plays set in the 1970s
Plays set in Greece
Cultural depictions of Jacqueline Kennedy Onassis
Cultural depictions of Aristotle Onassis
Plays by Martin Sherman